The 1991 Cincinnati Bengals season was the team's 24th year in professional football and its 22nd with the National Football League (NFL). Prior to the start of the season, the Bengals lost their patriarch when founder, former head coach and general manager Paul Brown died at the age of 82. His son Mike would assume control of the franchise. The Bengals would stumble out the gate losing their first eight games before defeating the Cleveland Browns 23–21 at Riverfront Stadium. The Bengals would only win two more games the rest of the season finishing with a 3–13 record.

The Bengals' pass defense would surrender 7.586 yards per pass attempt in 1991, one of the ten worst totals in NFL history.

Following the season head coach Sam Wyche was fired and replaced by assistant Dave Shula. Shula, the son of former Miami Dolphins and Baltimore Colts head coach Don Shula, served as the team’s wide receivers coach after a stint with the Miami Dolphins under his father, and the Dallas Cowboys as its offensive coordinator and wide receivers coach under head coach Jimmy Johnson. Upon his hiring as the Bengals’ head coach, he became the youngest head coach to ever be hired by an NFL team at age 32.

Offseason

NFL Draft

Personnel

Staff

Roster

Regular season

Schedule

Standings

Season summary

Week 16 at Steelers

Team leaders

Passing

Rushing

Receiving

Defensive

Kicking/Punting

Special teams

References

External links
 1991 Cincinnati Bengals at Pro-Football-Reference.com
 Bengals History on official website

Cincinnati Bengals
Cincinnati Bengals seasons
Cincin